This is a list of Kosovo national football team results from 2020 to 2029.

History

2020: Year to be forgotten
As Kosovo could not qualify through the normal group stage, Kosovo as a D3 League winner in the 2018–19 UEFA Nations League secured participation in UEFA Euro 2020 qualifying play-offs, where it will play with North Macedonia. Two months before the UEFA Euro 2020 qualifying play-offs, Kosovo played its first match in 2020 against Sweden in Doha on January 12, this friendly match ended in a 1–0 minimal away defeat and this match was a test match, where they were tested the players from the Football Superleague of Kosovo, but also players who not had space in national team. In addition to the match against Sweden it was planned to play another friendly match against United States on January 15, but the match was canceled by United States due to the 2019–20 Persian Gulf crisis.

Fixtures and results

2020

2021

2022

2023
Forthcoming fixtures
The following matches are scheduled:

Kosovo against other countries

Notes and references

Notes

References

External links
 
Kosovo at National Football Teams
Kosovo at RSSSF

Senior